Johan Löfstedt (born 10 November 1986) is a Swedish professional bandy player.

Career

Club career
Löfstedt is a youth product of Vetlanda and has represented their senior team and Sandviken.

International career
Löfstedt was part of Swedish World Champions teams of 2012 and 2017.

Honours

Country
 Sweden
 Bandy World Championship: 2012, 2017

References

External links
 
 

1986 births
Living people
Swedish bandy players
Vetlanda BK players
Sandvikens AIK players
Sweden international bandy players
Bandy World Championship-winning players